The 1863 Connecticut gubernatorial election was held on April 6, 1863. It was a rematch of the 1860 Connecticut gubernatorial election. Incumbent governor and Republican nominee William Alfred Buckingham defeated former governor and Democratic nominee Thomas H. Seymour with 51.64% of the vote.

General election

Candidates
Major party candidates

William Alfred Buckingham, Republican & Unionist
Thomas H. Seymour, Democratic

Results

References

1863
Connecticut
Gubernatorial